Beatrice of Rethel (1130/35 – 30 March 1185) was a French noblewoman and Queen of Sicily as the third wife of Roger II.

Family
Beatrice was born in 1130 or 1135, the eldest daughter and one of the nine children of Guitier of Rethel and Beatrix of Namur. Her father was Count of Rethel from 1158 to 1171.

Marriage, issue and widowhood
In 1151, Beatrice married Roger II of Sicily. She was queen for three years, until Roger's death on 26 February 1154. Beatrice was a little over three weeks pregnant at the time of his death, and their only child, Constance, was born the following November.

Beatrice survived her husband by thirty-one years but there is no record of her having married again. Her daughter Constance was confined to a monastery as a nun since childhood due a prophecy that "her marriage would destroy the kingdom". Beatrice lived long enough to see her betrothed in 1184. Constance became queen of Sicily in 1194.

References

Sources

1130s births
1185 deaths

Year of birth uncertain
Royal consorts of Sicily
12th-century French women
12th-century French people
12th-century Italian women
12th-century Italian nobility
Hauteville family
Roger II of Sicily